Juan Battista de Ojeda (died 1574) also Giovanni Battista de Hogeda or Giovanni Battista de Oxeda was a Roman Catholic prelate who served as Archbishop (personal title) of Agrigento (1571–1574) and Archbishop of Trani (1560–1571).

Biography
Juan Battista de Ojeda was born in Spain. On 26 January 1560, he was appointed by Pope Pius IV as Archbishop of Trani.
On 27 August 1571, he was appointed by Pope Pius V as Archbishop (personal title) of Agrigento.
He served as Bishop of Agrigento until his death in 1574.

References

External links and additional sources
 (for Chronology of Bishops) 
 (for Chronology of Bishops)  
 (for Chronology of Bishops)
 (for Chronology of Bishops) 

1574 deaths
16th-century Roman Catholic bishops in Sicily
Bishops appointed by Pope Pius IV
Bishops appointed by Pope Pius V
Archbishops of Trani